Webster Library may refer to:

 Webster Public Library, New York
 Webster Groves Public Library, Missouri
 Webster House, part of the Schenectady Public Library at Union College, New York
 Webster Library, part of the Cummings School of Veterinary Medicine at Tufts College, Massachusetts
 R. Howard Webster Library, part of the Concordia University Libraries in Quebec, Canada